Mi Amigo  (Spanish: My Friend) may refer to:

 MV Mi Amigo  a three masted cargo schooner, that later gained international recognition as an offshore radio station
 Mi Amigo memorial, a war memorial at Endcliffe Park, Sheffield, England

See also 
 Mi Amigo El Príncipe (My Friend The Prince), studio album by Mexican pop singer Cristian Castro
 Mi amigo Hugo, a Venezuelan television documentary
 Amigo (disambiguation)
 My Friend (disambiguation)